The 2017 World Series of Poker Europe (WSOPE) took place from October 19 to November 10 at King's Casino in Rozvadov, Czech Republic. It featured 11 bracelet events with buy-ins ranging from €550 to €111,111, culminating in the €10,350 No Limit Hold'em Main Event. The series was the first WSOP Europe since 2015, and the first to take place in the Czech Republic.

Event schedule
Source:

Player of the Year
Final standings as of November 10 (end of WSOPE):

Main Event

The 2017 World Series of Poker Europe Main Event began on November 4 and finished November 10. The event drew 529 entrants, generating a prize pool of €5,025,500. The top 80 players made the money, with the winner earning €1,115,207.

Final Table

*-Career statistics prior to beginning of 2017 WSOPE Main Event

Final Table results

References

World Series of Poker Europe
2017 in poker